Manchu Pallaki is a 1982 Indian Telugu-language film, produced by M. R. Prasad Rao and directed by Vamsy. It stars Chiranjeevi, Suhasini, Rajendra Prasad and Sai Chand, with music composed by Rajan–Nagendra. This film was director Vamsy's debut as film director. The film is a remake of the Tamil film Paalaivana Solai (1981).

Plot
Sekhar, Hari, Vasu, Kumar and Gandhi are unemployed youths living in a colony who are looking for jobs and are unable to make a living. Geeta moves into their colony with her father and everybody falls for her, one trying to make a fool of the other. They tease her, but she teaches them a lesson and later they become friends. Sekhar also likes her, but does not express it. Geeta changes the lives of all of them by making them earn their living by what they know and implementing it successfully. When Sekhar confesses his love to her he learns that she has a terminal disease and will die soon. But before dying, Geeta helps Vasu by marrying his sister to Sekhar.

Cast
Chiranjeevi as Sekhar
Suhasini as Geeta
Rajendra Prasad as Hari
Narayana Rao as Vasu
Sai Chand as Kumar
Girish as Gandhi
Sakshi Ranga Rao as Gita's father
P. L. Narayana as Vasu's colleague
Annapurna as Samalamma
Bhimeswara Rao as a doctor
Devadas Kanakala as Sekhar's colleague

Production 
Manchu Pallaki, a remake of the 1981 Tamil film Palaivana Cholai, was the directorial debut of Vamsy who also wrote the screenplay. Suhasini was chosen to reprise her role from the original.

Soundtrack
Music composed by Rajan–Nagendra.

References

External links

1982 films
1980s Telugu-language films
Films directed by Vamsy
Films scored by Rajan–Nagendra
Telugu remakes of Tamil films
1982 directorial debut films